The 2020 Canadian Tire National Skating Championships were held on January 13–19, 2020, in Mississauga, Ontario. Medals were awarded in the disciplines of men's singles, women's singles, pair skating, and ice dance on the senior, junior, and novice levels. Although the official International Skating Union terminology for female skaters in the singles category is ladies, Skate Canada uses women officially.  The results were part of the Canadian selection criteria for the 2020 World Championships, the 2020 Four Continents Championships, and the 2020 World Junior Championships.

Mississauga was announced as the host in January 2019. The city previously hosted the event in 2013 and has also previously hosted Skate Canada International four times (2000, 2003, 2011, and 2016). Competitors qualified at the Skate Canada Challenge held in Edmonton, Alberta in December 2019 or earned a bye.

Schedule
All times are listed in local time (UTC-05:00).

Entries
A list of qualified skaters was published on December 20, 2019.

Senior

Junior

Novice

Changes to preliminary entries

Medal summary

Senior

Junior

Novice

Senior results

Men
Messing placed first in the short program while defending champion Nguyen was second. Sadovsky ranked first in the free skating and won the title with a 17-point margin.

Women
Pineault, who missed the previous edition due to injury, placed first in the short program. Bausback, fourth after the short, won the free skate and the title.

Pairs
Moore-Towers / Marinaro won the pairs' title after ranking first in both segments.

Ice dance
Gilles / Poirier won both segments of the event. They had a wardrobe malfunction in the rhythm dance when her hair became caught in his costume.

Junior results

Men

Women

Pairs

Ice dance

Novice results

Men

Women

Pairs

Ice dance

International team selections

World Championships
The 2020 World Figure Skating Championships will be held in Montreal, Quebec, Canada from March 16–22, 2020. Skate Canada announced some assignments on January 19, 2020. The teams were updated on February 13, 2020 and finalized on February 24, 2020.

Four Continents Championships
The 2020 Four Continents Figure Skating Championships will be held in Seoul, South Korea from February 4–9, 2020. Skate Canada announced the assignments on January 19, 2020.

World Junior Championships
Commonly referred to as "Junior Worlds", the 2020 World Junior Figure Skating Championships will take place in Tallinn, Estonia from March 2–8, 2020. Skate Canada announced some assignments on January 19, 2020. The teams were updated on February 13, 2020 and finalized on February 24, 2020.

Winter Youth Olympics
The 2020 Winter Youth Olympics were held in Lausanne, Switzerland from January 10–15, 2020. The Canadian Championships were held after the Winter Youth Olympics.

References

External links
 

Canadian Figure Skating Championships
Figure skating
Canadian Figure Skating Championships
Canadian Figure Skating Championships